Zoltan Fodor is a Hungarian theoretical particle physicist,
best known for his works in lattice QCD by numerically solving the
theory of the strong interactions.

Life 
Zoltan Fodor was born in 1964 in Budapest, Hungary. In
high school and at university he won several national competitions in
mathematics, physics and chemistry. He did his undergraduate studies at
the Eotvos Lorand University, where he received his PhD in 1990. He was
postdoctoral fellow at DESY, Hamburg (Germany), CERN, Geneva
(Switzerland) and KEK, Tsukuba (Japan).

In 1998 he became a professor at the Lorand Eotvos University, Budapest, Hungary.
In 2003 he moved to the University of Wuppertal, Germany. In 2020 he joined the
Pennsylvania State University, USA.

Career 
Fodor is widely known for his results in lattice QCD. Many
of his findings represent the first fully controlled lattice
calculations using ab-initio quantum chromodynamics and quantum electrodynamics.

QCD thermodynamics 
In 2000 he proposed a method. to circumvent the
sign problem at finite baryonic chemical potentials or densities. The
numerical sign problem is one of the major unsolved problems in the
physics of many particle systems. In 2006 he determined the nature
of the QCD transition in the early universe. 
Since the transition turned
out to be an analytic one no observable cosmic relics are expected from
this transition. In a series of papers he also calculated the absolute
scale of the QCD transition. The equation of state of the strongly
interacting matter plays a crucial role both in cosmology and in
heavy ion collisions, which he determined in 2010. By calculating
the topological susceptibility in the early universe at high
temperatures, he gave a prediction for the axion's mass in 2016.
Axions are one of the mostly advocated candidates for dark matter.

QCD at vanishing temperature 
Since 2005 he has been the
spokesperson of the Budapest-Marseille-Wuppertal Collaboration focusing
on QCD phenomena at vanishing temperature. In 2008 they determined the
light hadron spectrum, which explains the mass of the visible universe
In 2015 the mass difference between the neutron and the proton
(and other so-called isospin splittings) were calculated. This 0.14
percent neutron-proton mass difference is responsible—among others—for the existence of atoms, as we know them, or for the ignition of
stars. In 2021 they determined the anomalous magnetic dipole moment of
the muon. This quantity is widely believed to indicate new physics
beyond the Standard Model. However, the Budapest-Marseille-Wuppertal
Collaboration obtained a theory-based result agreeing more with the
experimental value than with the previous theory-based value that relied
on the electron-positron annihilation experiments.

Awards 
2022 - Fellow of the American Physical Society
2021 - Top 10 Breakthroughs of the Year (magnetic moment of the muon)
2011 - European Physical Society, Fellow
2010 - Honorary Member of the Hungarian Academy of Sciences
2008 - Top 10 Breakthroughs of the Year (for determining the Hadron Spectrum)
2000 - Computerworld Award
1998 - Prize of the Hungarian Academy of Sciences

Notes

References 
 Z Fodor, SD Katz, Journal of High Energy Physics 2002 (03), 014. Lattice determination of the critical point of QCD at finite T and μ. 
 Y Aoki, G Endrődi, Z Fodor, SD Katz, KK Szabó. Nature 2006 (443), 675. The order of the quantum chromodynamics transition predicted by the standard model of particle physics. 
 S Borsanyi, Z Fodor, C Hoelbling, SD Katz, S Krieg, C Ratti, KK Szabo. Journal of High Energy Physics 2010 (9), 1. Is there still any T_c mystery in lattice QCD? Results with physical masses in the continuum limit III. 
 Calculation of the axion mass based on high-temperature lattice quantum chromodynamics. S Borsanyi, Z Fodor, J Guenther, KH Kampert, SD Katz, T Kawanai, et al. Nature 2016 (539), 69.
 S Durr, Z Fodor, J Frison, C Hoelbling, R Hoffmann, SD Katz, S Krieg, et al. Science 2008 (322), 1224. Ab initio determination of light hadron masses. 
 S Borsanyi, S Durr, Z Fodor, C Hoelbling, SD Katz, S Krieg, L Lellouch, et al. Science 2015 (347), 1452. Ab initio calculation of the neutron-proton mass difference.
 S Borsanyi, Z Fodor, JN Guenther, C Hoelbling, SD Katz, L Lellouch, et al. Nature 2021 (593), 51. Leading-order hadronic vacuum polarization contribution to the muon magnetic moment from lattice QCD.

External links 
 Publications of Zoltan Fodor: https://inspirehep.net/authors/1009767?ui-citation-summary=true

Living people
Pennsylvania State University faculty
Members of the Hungarian Academy of Sciences
People from Budapest
Hungarian physicists
Year of birth missing (living people)
Fellows of the American Physical Society